Escavadodon ("tooth from Escavada") is an extinct genus of pangolin-like insectivorous mammal which was endemic to North America during the Early Paleocene (Torrejonian in the NALMA classification), from approximately 63.8 to 60.9 Ma, existing for approximately . It contains a single species, Escavadodon zygus.

Taxonomy
The monotypic family Escavadodontidae was erected by Rose and Lucas in 2000 to hold the type species, recovered from the Nacimiento Formation of New Mexico.

Phylogenetic tree
The phylogenetic relationships of genus Escavadodon is shown in the following cladogram:

References 

Palaeanodonta
Paleocene mammals of North America
Torrejonian
Fossils of the United States
Paleontology in New Mexico
Fossil taxa described in 2000